Saltivskyi District is an urban district of the city of Kharkiv, Ukraine, named after Saltivka residential area.

The district was created in 1937 when Petynsko-Zhuravlivskyi District was split into Kahanovychskyi and Stalinskyi districts. In 1961 Stalinskyi District was renamed to Moskovskyi. On 11 May 2022, it was renamed to Saltivskyi because the name "Moskovskyi" was "associated with the aggressor country" following the February 2022 Russian invasion of Ukraine. Saltivka had been one of the worst affected areas in Kharkiv of the Battle of Kharkiv.

Places
 Saburova dacha
 selyshche imeni Kirova
 Yevheniivka
 Saltivka: Pershe Saltivske selyshche, Pivnichna Saltivka
 micro-districts: 601, 603, 604, 606, 531, 533, 521
 Rodnyky

References

External links
 Moskovskyi Raion website
 Korol, Yu., Zaitsev, B., Kudelko, S., Posokhov, S. Moskovskyi Raion. Kharkiv city. History and contemporary times (Московский район. г.Харьков. Исторя и современность). "Prapor". 1994.

 
Urban districts of Kharkiv